Svend Erik Bjerg (born 16 November 1944) is a Danish former cyclist. He competed at the 1968 Summer Olympics and the 1972 Summer Olympics.

References

External links
 

1944 births
Living people
People from Lolland Municipality
Danish male cyclists
Olympic cyclists of Denmark
Cyclists at the 1968 Summer Olympics
Cyclists at the 1972 Summer Olympics
Sportspeople from Region Zealand